Andrejs Maticins (born January 30, 1963) is retired Latvian professional ice hockey player and coach, currently he is assistant coach for Severstal Cherepovets of the Kontinental Hockey League (KHL).

Playing career
Maticins began his career in Dinamo Riga, he was a part of Dinamo Soviet Championship silver medal run in 1987-88 season. Later in his career, he played outside Latvia, mainly in Sweden.

International
During his career Maticins was regular for Latvian national team helping team Latvia in the promotion to World Championships elite division and playing in four world championships. He also represented Latvia in 2002 Winter Olympics. which was his last tournament with team Latvia.

Coaching career
After finishing playing in 2006 Maticins began coaching. He coached Latvian national U20 team in 2009 Championships to 8th-place finish.

In 2013-14 season Maticins accepted job as assistant coach of Severstal Cherepovets.

Career statistics

Regular season and playoffs

International

References

External links 
 
 
 
 

1963 births
Living people
Soviet ice hockey defencemen
Ice hockey people from Riga
Latvian ice hockey defencemen
Dinamo Riga players
Ice hockey players at the 2002 Winter Olympics
Olympic ice hockey players of Latvia
Latvian ice hockey coaches
Expatriate ice hockey players in Finland
Expatriate ice hockey players in Sweden
People from Cherepovets
Latvian expatriate ice hockey people
Latvian expatriate sportspeople in Sweden
Latvian expatriate sportspeople in Finland